Demonic Males: Apes and the Origins of Human Violence is a 1996 book by Richard Wrangham and Dale Peterson examining the evolutionary factors leading to human male violence.

Summary
Demonic Males begins by explaining that humans, chimpanzees, gorillas and orangutans are a group of genetically related great apes, that humans are genetically closer to chimps than chimps are to gorillas, and that chimps and bonobos are most closely genetically related. After speculating about what enabled humans' ancestors to leave the rainforest (the use of roots as sources of water and food), Demonic Males next provides a catalog of the types of violence practiced by male chimpanzees (intragroup hierarchical violence, violence against females, and extragroup murdering raids). The high incidence of rape by non-alpha male orangutans and infanticide by male gorillas are also cited as examples of our mutual genetic heritage.

The authors present chimp society as extremely patriarchal, in that no adult male chimpanzee is subordinate to any female of any rank. They present evidence that most dominant human civilizations have always been likewise behaviorally patriarchal, and that male humans share male chimpanzees' innate propensity for dominance, gratuitous violence, war, rape, and murder. They claim that the brain's prefrontal cortex is also a factor, as humans have been shown experimentally to make decisions based both on logic and prefrontal cortex-mediated emotion.

To contrast chimp societies, in the chapter "The Peaceful Ape", the authors contrast chimpanzee behaviors with those of the bonobo, presenting logical biological reasons for the more pacific (although also aggressive and antagonistic) behaviors of the latter. Reasons given for this include a bonobo female social organization that does not tolerate male aggression, the evolutionary forces of the invisibility of bonobo ovulation (in chimps, ovulation has both olfactory and genital swelling manifestations. This diversity in female reproductive cycles then leads to ferocious male competition for mating), and overall social organization, whereby male bonobos do not form alliances as male chimps do, though this has been contested.

Bonobos are dominated by a matriarchal system, and are unique for their female-biased dispersal relationships that encourage resolution and peace-making tactics among the group, and discourage violence and war. Anthropological parallels can be made to human subcultures such as the Hippies, expressed in the motto that Hippies and Bonobos make love, not war. Anthropologists using post modern perspective try to explain how Bonobo social structure rejects aggression and focuses on the power of cooperation, and how this benefits the overall survival of the group.

The authors consider male violence to be evolutionarily undesirable and morally reprehensible (explicitly detailing the Hutu-Tutsi cross-genocides in Africa's Great Ape habitats, and citing Charlotte Perkins Gilman's female utopian novel Herland [1915]), and argue that the advent of modern weapons such as nerve gas and atomic bombs threatens our collective future. Like Steven Pinker's The Better Angels of Our Nature: Why Violence Has Declined (2012), which makes the case that violence has been decreasing in human society over time, Demonic Males makes the case that human males are genetically predisposed to violence, but that the human species also has the intellectual capacity to override this flaw if society recognizes that it is in human survival's interest to do so.

Reviews
In a political interpretation of Demonic Males, biologist Philip Regal says that the book is partly an attack on the deconstructivist feminist theory that male violence is a purely social construct. Regal also considers the book to be "a broadside against the old utopian dreams of Atlantis, Eden, Elysium, a Golden Age, Romantic paintings, and the late Margaret Mead", which imagined human beings as naturally peaceful.

The New York Times called it "enjoyable and easy to read", and said it "belongs to the emerging genre of serious scientific books that have something to say about questions of interest to many people, not just to specialists".

References

External links
Chapter One

1996 non-fiction books
Books about men
Evolutionary biology literature
Biology books
English non-fiction literature
Human evolution books
Collaborative non-fiction books
Men's studies literature